The Journal of the Norwegian Medical Association is a biweekly peer-reviewed medical journal published by the Norwegian Medical Association. It was established in 1881, five years before the Norwegian Medical Association was established, as the Tidsskrift for praktisk Medicin. The journal changed names in 1888 to Organ for Den norske lægeforening before obtaining its current name in 1890 (until 2008 spelled as Tidsskrift for Den norske lægeforening). It includes research and review articles, news stories, and debates about professional issues and education, as well as discussion of medical education. The journal has been indexed by Index Medicus, MEDLINE, and PubMed since 1965.

Besides the medical articles, the main content of the journal are news and debate articles.

The journal accepts advertising for prescription drugs that cannot be legally advertised to the general public. It also includes advertisements for specialist practices and private hospitals. The editor-in-chief from 2002 to 2015 was Charlotte Haug, and since then Are Brean.

External links

Norwegian-language journals
Publications established in 1881
General medical journals
Biweekly journals
1881 establishments in Norway